Wesley Williams may refer to:
 Wesley Augustus Williams (1897-1984), New York City firefighter
 Wesley S. Williams Jr. (born 1942), American lawyer and Anglican priest
 Wesley "Wes" Williams (born 1968), Canadian rapper, record producer, actor, and author better known as Maestro Fresh Wes